The Iron Claw is a 1916 American silent adventure 20 episode film serial starring Pearl White, directed by George B. Seitz and Edward José, and released by Pathé Exchange. A print of the seventh episode exists in the UCLA Film and Television Archive.

Cast
 Pearl White as Margery Golden
 Creighton Hale as Davey
 Sheldon Lewis as Legar, The Iron Claw
 Harry L. Fraser as The Laughing Mask
 J. E. Dunn as Enoch Golden
 Carey Lee as Mrs. Golden
 Clare Miller as Margery, as a Child
 Henry G. Sell as Wrench
 Edward José as Manley
 E. Cooper Willis
 Allan Walker
 Bert Gudgeon
 George B. Seitz

References

External links

1916 films
1916 lost films
1916 adventure films
American adventure films
American silent serial films
American black-and-white films
Films directed by George B. Seitz
Films directed by Edward José
Lost American films
Pathé Exchange film serials
Lost adventure films
1910s American films
Silent adventure films